The 1999 Louisiana–Lafayette Ragin' Cajuns football team represented the University of Louisiana at Lafayette as an independent the 1999 NCAA Division I-A football season. They were led by first-year head coach Jerry Baldwin and played their home games at Cajun Field in Lafayette, Louisiana.

Schedule

References

Louisiana–Lafayette
Louisiana Ragin' Cajuns football seasons
Louisiana–Lafayette Ragin' Cajuns football